Anataphrus is an extinct genus of trilobites in the family Asaphidae.

Species
These four species belong to the genus Anataphrus:
 † Anataphrus borraeus Whittington, 1954
 † Anataphrus kermiti Amati, 2014
 † Anataphrus martinensis Ross & Shaw, 1972
 † Anataphrus megalophrys Amati, 2014

References

Asaphidae
Articles created by Qbugbot